Boris Antonovich Khrolovich (born 16 April 1936) is a Belarusian racewalker. He competed in the men's 20 kilometres walk at the 1964 Summer Olympics, representing the Soviet Union.

References

1936 births
Living people
Athletes (track and field) at the 1964 Summer Olympics
Belarusian male racewalkers
Soviet male racewalkers
Olympic athletes of the Soviet Union
Place of birth missing (living people)